Nanoparticles for drug delivery to the brain is a method for transporting drug molecules across the blood–brain barrier (BBB) using nanoparticles. These drugs cross the BBB and deliver pharmaceuticals to the brain for therapeutic treatment of neurological disorders. These disorders include Parkinson's disease, Alzheimer's disease, schizophrenia, depression, and brain tumors. Part of the difficulty in finding cures for these central nervous system (CNS) disorders is that there is yet no truly efficient delivery method for drugs to cross the BBB. Antibiotics, antineoplastic agents, and a variety of CNS-active drugs, especially neuropeptides, are a few examples of molecules that cannot pass the BBB alone. With the aid of nanoparticle delivery systems, however, studies have shown that some drugs can now cross the BBB, and even exhibit lower toxicity and decrease adverse effects throughout the body. Toxicity is an important concept for pharmacology because high toxicity levels in the body could be detrimental to the patient by affecting other organs and disrupting their function. Further, the BBB is not the only physiological barrier for drug delivery to the brain. Other biological factors influence how drugs are transported throughout the body and how they target specific locations for action. Some of these pathophysiological factors include blood flow alterations, edema and increased intracranial pressure, metabolic perturbations, and altered gene expression and protein synthesis. Though there exist many obstacles that make developing a robust delivery system difficult, nanoparticles provide a promising mechanism for drug transport to the CNS.

Background 
The first successful delivery of a drug across the BBB occurred in 1995. The drug used was hexapeptide dalargin, an anti-nociceptive peptide that cannot cross the BBB alone. It was encapsulated in polysorbate 80 coated nanoparticles and intravenously injected. This was a huge breakthrough in the nanoparticle drug delivery field, and it helped advance research and development toward clinical trials of nanoparticle delivery systems. Nanoparticles range in size from 10 - 1000 nm (or 1 µm) and they can be made from natural or artificial polymers, lipids, dendrimers, and micelles. Most polymers used for nanoparticle drug delivery systems are natural, biocompatible, and biodegradable, which helps prevent contamination in the CNS. Several current methods for drug delivery to the brain include the use of liposomes, prodrugs, and carrier-mediated transporters. Many different delivery methods exist to transport these drugs into the body, such as peroral, intranasal, intravenous, and intracranial. For nanoparticles, most studies have shown increasing progression with intravenous delivery. Along with delivery and transport methods, there are several means of functionalizing, or activating, the nanoparticle carriers. These means include dissolving or absorbing a drug throughout the nanoparticle, encapsulating a drug inside the particle, or attaching a drug on the surface of the particle.

Types of nanoparticles for CNS drug delivery

Lipid-based 

One type of nanoparticle involves use of liposomes as drug molecule carriers. The diagram on the right shows a standard liposome. It has a phospholipid bilayer separating the interior from the exterior of the cell.

Liposomes are composed of vesicular bilayers, lamellae, made of biocompatible and biodegradable lipids such as sphingomyelin, phosphatidylcholine, and glycerophospholipids. Cholesterol, a type of lipid, is also often incorporated in the lipid-nanoparticle formulation. Cholesterol can increase stability of a liposome and prevent leakage of a bilayer because its hydroxyl group can interact with the polar heads of the bilayer phospholipids. Liposomes have the potential to protect the drug from degradation, target sites for action, and reduce toxicity and adverse effects. Lipid nanoparticles can be manufactured by high pressure homogenization, a current method used to produce parenteral emulsions. This process can ultimately form a uniform dispersion of small droplets in a fluid substance by subdividing particles until the desired consistency is acquired. This manufacturing process is already scaled and in use in the food industry, which therefore makes it more appealing for researchers and for the drug delivery industry.

Liposomes can also be functionalized by attaching various ligands on the surface to enhance brain-targeted delivery.

Cationic liposomes 
Another type of lipid-nanoparticle that can be used for drug delivery to the brain is a cationic liposome. These are lipid molecules that are positively charged. One example of cationic liposomes uses bolaamphiphiles, which contain hydrophilic groups surrounding a hydrophobic chain to strengthen the boundary of the nano-vesicle containing the drug. Bolaamphiphile nano-vesicles can cross the BBB, and they allow controlled release of the drug to target sites. Lipoplexes can also be formed from cationic liposomes and DNA solutions, to yield transfection agents. Cationic liposomes cross the BBB through adsorption mediated endocytosis followed by internalization in the endosomes of the endothelial cells. By transfection of endothelial cells through the use of lipoplexes, physical alterations in the cells could be made. These physical changes could potentially improve how some nanoparticle drug-carriers cross the BBB.

Metallic 
Metal nanoparticles are promising as carriers for drug delivery to the brain. Common metals used for nanoparticle drug delivery are gold, silver, and platinum, owing to their biocompatibility. These metallic nanoparticles are used due to their large surface area to volume ratio, geometric and chemical tunability, and endogenous antimicrobial properties. Silver cations released from silver nanoparticles can bind to the negatively charged cellular membrane of bacteria and increase membrane permeability, allowing foreign chemicals to enter the intracellular fluid.

Metal nanoparticles are chemically synthesized using reduction reactions. For example, drug-conjugated silver nanoparticles are created by reducing silver nitrate with sodium borohydride in the presence of an ionic drug compound. The drug binds to the surface of the silver, stabilizing the nanoparticles and preventing the nanoparticles from aggregation.

Metallic nanoparticles typically cross the BBB via transcytosis. Nanoparticle delivery through the BBB can be increased by introducing peptide conjugates to improve permeability to the central nervous system. For instance, recent studies have shown an improvement in gold nanoparticle delivery efficiency by conjugating a peptide that binds to the transferrin receptors expressed in brain endothelial cells.

Solid lipid 

Also, solid lipid nanoparticles (SLNs) are lipid nanoparticles with a solid interior as shown in the diagram on the right. SLNs can be made by replacing the liquid lipid oil used in the emulsion process with a solid lipid. In solid lipid nanoparticles, the drug molecules are dissolved in the particle's solid hydrophobic lipid core, this is called the drug payload, and it is surrounded by an aqueous solution. Many SLNs are developed from triglycerides, fatty acids, and waxes. High-pressure homogenization or micro-emulsification can be used for manufacturing. Further, functionalizing the surface of solid lipid nanoparticles with polyethylene glycol (PEG) can result in increased BBB permeability. Different colloidal carriers such as liposomes, polymeric nanoparticles, and emulsions have reduced stability, shelf life and encapsulation efficacy. Solid lipid nanoparticles are designed to overcome these shortcomings and have an excellent drug release and physical stability apart from targeted delivery of drugs.

Nanoemulsions 
Another form for nanoparticle delivery systems is oil-in-water emulsions done on a nano-scale. This process uses common biocompatible oils such as triglycerides and fatty acids, and combines them with water and surface-coating surfactants. Oils rich in omega-3 fatty acids especially contain important factors that aid in penetrating the tight junctions of the BBB.

Polymer-based 
Other nanoparticles are polymer-based, meaning they are made from a natural polymer such as polylactic acid (PLA), poly D,L-glycolide (PLG),

polylactide-co-glycolide (PLGA), and polycyanoacrylate (PCA). Some studies have found that polymeric nanoparticles may provide better results for drug delivery relative to lipid-based nanoparticles because they may increase the stability of the drugs or proteins being transported. Polymeric nanoparticles may also contain beneficial controlled release mechanisms.

Nanoparticles made from natural polymers that are biodegradable have the abilities to target specific organs and tissues in the body, to carry DNA for gene therapy, and to deliver larger molecules such as proteins, peptides, and even genes. To manufacture these polymeric nanoparticles, the drug molecules are first dissolved and then encapsulated or attached to a polymer nanoparticle matrix. Three different structures can then be obtained from this process; nanoparticles, nanocapsules (in which the drug is encapsulated and surrounded by the polymer matrix), and nanospheres (in which the drug is dispersed throughout the polymeric matrix in a spherical form).

One of the most important traits for nanoparticle delivery systems is that they must be biodegradable on the scale of a few days. A few common polymer materials used for drug delivery studies are polybutyl cyanoacrylate (PBCA), poly(isohexyl cyanoacrylate) (PIHCA), polylactic acid (PLA), or polylactide-co-glycolide (PLGA). PBCA undergoes degradation through enzymatic cleavage of its ester bond on the alkyl side chain to produce water-soluble byproducts. PBCA also proves to be the fastest biodegradable material, with studies showing 80% reduction after 24 hours post intravenous therapy injection. PIHCA, however, was recently found to display an even lower degradation rate, which in turn further decreases toxicity. PIHCA, due to this slight advantage, is currently undergoing phase III clinical trials for transporting the drug doxorubicin as a treatment for hepatocellular carcinomas.

Human serum albumin (HSA) and chitosan are also materials of interest for the generation of nanoparticle delivery systems. Using albumin nanoparticles for stroke therapy can overcome numerous limitations. For instance, albumin nanoparticles can enhance BBB permeability, increase solubility, and increase half-life in circulation. Patients who have brain cancer overexpress albumin-binding proteins, such as SPARC and gp60, in their BBB and tumor cells, naturally increasing the uptake of albumin into the brain. Using this relationship, researches have formed albumin nanoparticles that co-encapsulate two anticancer drugs, paclitaxel and fenretinide, modified with low weight molecular protamine (LMWP), a type of cell-penetrating protein, for anti-glioma therapy. Once injected into the patient's body, the albumin nanoparticles can cross the BBB more easily, bind to the proteins and penetrate glioma cells, and then release the contained drugs. This nanoparticle formulation enhances tumor-targeting delivery efficiency and improves the solubility issue of hydrophobic drugs. Specifically, cationic bovine serum albumin-conjugated tanshinone IIA PEGylated nanoparticles injected into a MCAO rat model decreased the volume of infarction and neuronal apoptosis. Chitosan, a naturally abundant polysaccharide, is particularly useful due to its biocompability and lack of toxicity. With its adsorptive and mucoadhesive properties, chitosan can overcome limitations of internasal administration to the brain. It has been shown that cationic chitosan nanoparticles interact with the negatively charged brain endothelium.

Coating these polymeric nanoparticle devices with different surfactants can also aid BBB crossing and uptake in the brain. Surfactants such as polysorbate 80, 20, 40, 60, and poloxamer 188, demonstrated positive drug delivery through the blood–brain barrier, whereas other surfactants did not yield the same results. It has also been shown that functionalizing the surface of nanoparticles with polyethylene glycol (PEG), can induce the "stealth effect", allowing the drug-loaded nanoparticle to circulate throughout the body for prolonged periods of time. Further, the stealth effect, caused in part by the hydrophilic and flexible properties of the PEG chains, facilitates an increase in localizing the drug at target sites in tissues and organs.

Mechanisms for delivery

Liposomes 
A mechanism for liposome transport across the BBB is lipid-mediated free diffusion, a type of facilitated diffusion, or lipid-mediated endocytosis. There exist many lipoprotein receptors which bind lipoproteins to form complexes that in turn transport the liposome nano-delivery system across the BBB. Apolipoprotein E (apoE) is a protein that facilitates transport of lipids and cholesterol. ApoE constituents bind to nanoparticles, and then this complex binds to a low-density lipoprotein receptor (LDLR) in the BBB and allows transport to occur.

Polymeric nanoparticles 
The mechanism for the transport of polymer-based nanoparticles across the BBB has been characterized as receptor-mediated endocytosis by the brain capillary endothelial cells. Transcytosis then occurs to transport the nanoparticles across the tight junction of endothelial cells and into the brain. Surface coating nanoparticles with surfactants such as polysorbate 80 or poloxamer 188 was shown to increase uptake of the drug into the brain also. This mechanism also relies on certain receptors located on the luminal surface of endothelial cells of the BBB. Ligands coated on the nanoparticle's surface bind to specific receptors to cause a conformational change. Once bound to these receptors, transcytosis can commence, and this involves the formation of vesicles from the plasma membrane pinching off the nanoparticle system after internalization.

Additional receptors identified for receptor-mediated endocytosis of nanoparticle delivery systems are the scavenger receptor class B type I (SR-BI), LDL receptor (LRP1), transferrin receptor, and insulin receptor. As long as a receptor exists on the endothelial surface of the BBB, any ligand can be attached to the nanoparticle's surface to functionalize it so that it can bind and undergo endocytosis.

Another mechanism is adsorption mediated transcytosis, where electrostatic interactions are involved in mediating nanoparticle crossing of the BBB. Cationic nanoparticles (including cationic liposomes) are of interest for this mechanism, because their positive charges assist binding on the brain's endothelial cells. Using TAT-peptides, a cell-penetrating peptide, to functionalize the surface of cationic nanoparticles can further improve drug transport into the brain.

Magnetic and Magnetoelectric nanoparticles 
In contrast to the above mechanisms, a delivery with magnetic fields doesn't strongly depend on the biochemistry of the brain. In this case, nanoparticles are literally pulled across the BBB via application of a magnetic field gradient. The nanoparticles can be pulled in as well as removed from the brain merely by controlling the direction of the gradient. For the approach to work, the nanoparticles must have a non-zero magnetic moment and have a diameter of less than 50 nm. Both magnetic and magnetoelectric nanoparticles (MENs) satisfy the requirements. However, it is only the MENs which display a non-zero magnetoelectric (ME) effect. Due to the ME effect, MENs can provide a direct access to local intrinsic electric fields at the nanoscale to enable a two-way communication with the neural network at the single-neuron level. MENs, proposed by the research group of Professor Sakhrat Khizroev at Florida International University (FIU), have been used for targeted drug delivery and externally controlled release across the BBB to treat HIV and brain tumors, as well as to wirelessly stimulate neurons deep in the brain for treatment of neurodegenerative diseases such as Parkinson's Disease and others.

Focused ultrasound 
Studies have shown that focused ultrasound bursts can noninvasively be used to disrupt tight junctions in desired locations of BBB, allowing for the increased passage of particles at that location. This disruption can last up to four hours after burst administration. Focused ultrasound works by generating oscillating microbubbles, which physically interact with the cells of the BBB by oscillating at a frequency which can be tuned by the ultrasound burst. This physical interaction is believed to cause cavitation and ultimately the disintegration of the tight junction complexes which may explain why this effect lasts for several hours. However, the energy applied from ultrasound can result in tissue damage. Fortunately, studies have demonstrated that this risk can be reduced if preformed microbubbles are first injected before focused ultrasound is applied, reducing the energy required from the ultrasound. This technique has applications in the treatment of various diseases. For example, one study has shown that using focused ultrasound with oscillating bubbles loaded with a chemotherapeutic drug, carmustine, facilitates the safe treatment of glioblastoma in an animal model. This drug, like many others, normally requires large dosages to reach the target brain tissue diffusion from the blood, leading to systemic toxicity and the possibilities of multiple harmful side effects manifesting throughout the body. However, focused ultrasound has the potential to increase the safety and efficacy of drug delivery to the brain.

Toxicity 
A study was performed to assess the toxicity effects of doxorubicin-loaded polymeric nanoparticle systems. It was found that doses up to 400 mg/kg of PBCA nanoparticles alone did not cause any toxic effects on the organism. These low toxicity effects can most likely be attributed to the controlled release and modified biodistribution of the drug due to the traits of the nanoparticle delivery system. Toxicity is a highly important factor and limit of drug delivery studies, and a major area of interest in research on nanoparticle delivery to the brain.

Metal nanoparticles are associated with risks of neurotoxicity and cytotoxicity. These heavy metals generate reactive oxygen species, which causes oxidative stress and damages the cells' mitochondria and endoplasmic reticulum. This leads to further issues in cellular toxicity, such as damage to DNA and disruption of cellular pathways. Silver nanoparticles in particular have a higher degree of toxicity compared to other metal nanoparticles such as gold or iron. Silver nanoparticles can circulate through the body and accumulate easily in multiple organs, as discovered in a study on the silver nanoparticle distribution in rats. Traces of silver accumulated in the rats' lungs, spleen, kidney, liver, and brain after the nanoparticles were injected subcutaneously. In addition, silver nanoparticles generate more reactive oxygen species compared to other metals, which leads to an overall larger issue of toxicity.

Research 
In the early 21st century, extensive research is occurring in the field of nanoparticle drug delivery systems to the brain. One of the common diseases being studied in neuroscience is Alzheimer's disease. Many studies have been done to show how nanoparticles can be used as a platform to deliver therapeutic drugs to these patients with the disease. A few Alzheimer's drugs that have been studied especially are rivastigmine, tacrine, quinoline, piperine, and curcumin. PBCA, chitosan, and PLGA nanoparticles were used as delivery systems for these drugs. Overall, the results from each drug injection with these nanoparticles showed remarkable improvements in the effects of the drug relative to non-nanoparticle delivery systems. This possibly suggests that nanoparticles could provide a promising solution to how these drugs could cross the BBB. One factor that still must be considered and accounted for is nanoparticle accumulation in the body. With long-term and frequent injections that are often required to treat chronic diseases such as Alzheimer's disease, polymeric nanoparticles could potentially build up in the body, causing undesirable effects. This area for concern would have to be further assessed to analyze these possible effects and to improve them.

References

External links 

Neuroscience
Nanomedicine